Indori Ishq is a romantic-drama web series which is directed by Samit Kakkad and written by Kunal Marathe. The show features Ritvik Sahore, Vedika Bhandari, Aashay Kulkarni. The show was released on 10 June 2021 and in a very small period of time, it gained popularity with positive response in all over the country because the story is quite very interesting and emotional.

Plot 
The story begins with amusing attempts of twelfth-grader, Kunal, to woo his classmate, Tara. Kunal finally manages to propose to Tara and their love story begins. After his schooling, Kunal leaves Indore and moves to Mumbai to join a Naval College. Soon his sober life turns upside-down when Tara dumps him for someone else. In no time, Kunal turns into an alcoholic and chain smoker, and without taking admission in the naval college, he moves to a weird rundown room in Darukhana, spending days doing nothing but drinking, smoking, and missing Tara. Later Kunal gets played by Tara once again as things turn up against his fate.

Cast
 Ritvik Sahore as Kunal Marathe 
 Vedika Bhandari as Tara
 Aashay Kulkarni as Mahesh
 Tithi Raaj as Kamna
 Donna Munshi as Reshma
 Mira Joshi as Alia
 Yashaswi Devadiga as Edline
 Deepti Devi as Kunal's sister
 Abha Velankar as Kunal's mother
 Mira Jagannath as Special appearance
 Sushant Shelar as Police Inspector
 Santosh Juvekar as ACP

Music

References

External links

Indian drama web series
MX Player original programming
2021 web series debuts
Television shows set in Madhya Pradesh
Indian romance television series
Indori Ishq Season 2 release date